Lyndsey Van Belle (born 31 August 2003) is a Belgian footballer who plays as a defender for Club YLA in Belgian Women's Super League and the Belgium national team.

International career
Van Belle made her debut for the Belgium national team on 12 June 2021, against Luxembourg.

References

External links
 
 
 
 Lyndsey Van Belle at Soccerdonna.de 
 
 
 

2003 births
Living people
Women's association football defenders
Belgian women's footballers
Belgium women's international footballers
K.A.A. Gent (women) players
Super League Vrouwenvoetbal players
Club Brugge KV (women) players